Sinoville is a northern suburb of Pretoria, South Africa. It lies to the east of the Wonderboom, on the northern slopes of the Magaliesberg mountains.

References

Suburbs of Pretoria